During the 2016–17 FC Twente season, the club participated in the Eredivisie and the KNVB Cup.

Squad

Last updated: 4 March 2017

New contracts

Last updated: 29 January 2017

Transfers

In

Summer

Winter

Out

Summer

Winter

Loan in

Summer

Loan out

Summer

Winter

Last updated: 31 January 2017

Non-competitive

Friendlies

Last updated: 17 August 2016

Competitions

Eredivisie

League table

League matches

Last updated: 28 May 2017

KNVB Cup

Last updated: 23 September 2016

Statistics

Appearances and goals

|-

|-
|colspan="10"|Players who left the club during the 2016–17 season
|-

|}

Goalscorers

References

FC Twente seasons
Twente